The men's tournament in sitting volleyball at the 2016 Summer Paralympics was held between 9 and 18 September.

Results

Preliminary round

Group A

Group B

Knock-out stage

Bracket

Classification 7th / 8th

Classification fifth / sixth

Semi-finals

Bronze medal game

Gold medal game

Final ranking

See also
 Sitting volleyball at the 2016 Summer Paralympics – Women

References

Men